Dactyloceras maculata is a moth in the family Brahmaeidae. It was described by A. Conte in 1911. It is found in Kenya and Tanzania.

References

Brahmaeidae
Moths described in 1911